Naajaat (Kalaallisut: "Seagulls") is a settlement in Avannaata municipality in northwestern Greenland. Former spellings include Naujât, Naujat, and Naajat. Located on a small island of the same name, the settlement has 49 inhabitants as of 2020.

Upernavik Archipelago 

Naajaat is located within Upernavik Archipelago, a vast archipelago of small islands on the coast of northeastern Baffin Bay.

Population 
The population of Naajaat has been relatively stable over the last two decades.

References 

Populated places in Greenland
Populated places of Arctic Greenland
Tasiusaq Bay
Upernavik Archipelago